Liku may refer to:

People
 ʻAloʻalo Liku, Tongan javelin and discus thrower
 Ana Siulolo Liku (born 1974), Tongan hurdler
 Maria Liku (born 1990), Fijian weightlifter
 Tauʻalupe Liku, Tongan rugby league football player

Places
 Liku, Niue
 Liku, Wallis and Futuna
 Liku, another name for Likhu Khola, a river in Nepal